Thomas William Gilbert (June 15, 1926 – December 22, 2016) was a Canadian politician. He served in the Legislative Assembly of New Brunswick from 1987 to 1991, as a Liberal member for the constituency of Oromocto.

References

New Brunswick Liberal Association MLAs
1926 births
2016 deaths